Parliamentary elections were held in Cyprus on 5 September 1976. The elections were contested by two alliances; one consisting of the Democratic Front (DIKO), the Progressive Party of Working People (AKEL) and the Movement for Social Democracy (EDEK) and one consisting of the Democratic National Party (DEK) and Democratic Rally (DISY).

The DIKO–AKEL–EDEK alliance received just over 70% of the vote and won 34 of the 35 seats, with the remaining seat going to an independent. Within the alliance, DIKO took 21 seats, AKEL nine and EDEK four. Voter turnout was 85.3%.

Results

References

1976 in Cyprus
Cyprus
Legislative elections in Cyprus
September 1976 events in Europe